Court Appointed Special Advocates (CASA) is a national association in the United States that supports and promotes court-appointed advocates for abused or neglected children.  CASA are volunteers from the community who complete training that has been provided by the state or local CASA office.  They are appointed by a judge, and their role is to gather information and make recommendations in the best interest of the child, keeping the child's personal wishes in mind.

According to the National CASA Association, there are more than 93,000 volunteers nationwide, serving in 49 states and the District of Columbia.  North Dakota is the only state without a CASA program.  Each year more than a quarter of a million children are assisted through CASA services.

History
In 1977, Seattle Superior Court Judge David Soukup was faced with making decisions on behalf of abused and neglected children with only the information provided by the state Child Protective Services. Soukup formulated the idea that volunteers could be dedicated to a case and speak for children's best interests. Fifty volunteers responded to his idea, which started a movement to provide better representation for abused and neglected children throughout the United States.  By 2007, the National CASA Association had served 2 million children nationwide.

Current situation
Since its founding, CASA programming has grown to cover 49 U.S. states and the District of Columbia.  Each state's program is responsible for developing and funding a budget. Some state and local agencies receive government funding, while others do not. The National CASA agency relies on pass thru grants from the Office of Juvenile Justice and Delinquency Prevention as well as partnerships with non-profit organizations, philanthropic corporations, and community action groups.

CASA are generally appointed at the first hearing for the welfare of a child.  In some states, a child will be assigned a lawyer as guardian ad litem (GAL) to represent the child in court.  The GAL can double as a CASA, and in some situations, a child will be assigned both a CASA and a GAL.

There are over 400,000 children aged 0–21 in foster care in the US.

Training
CASA are volunteers from the community who complete training that has been provided by the state or local CASA office.  The training consists of a minimum of 30 hours classroom instruction, court observation, and continued training each year.  CASA must also pass a criminal background check.  Each state develops its own program, implementing the national training and program standards.  There are no educational requirements that CASA volunteers must meet, other than completing the training.

See also
 Child Protection and Obscenity Enforcement Act

References

Legal organizations based in the United States
Foster care in the United States
Child welfare in the United States
Children's rights organizations in the United States